The Thelebolales are an order of the class Leotiomycetes within the division Ascomycota. It contains the single family Thelebolaceae, circumscribed in 1968 by Finnish mycologist Finn-Egil Eckblad.

Genera
The following 15 genera are included in the Thelebolaceae, according to the 2007 Outline of Ascomycota:
Antarctomyces
Ascophanus
Ascozonus
Caccobius
Coprobolus
Coprotiella
Coprotus
Dennisiopsis
Leptokalpion
Mycoarctium
Ochotrichobolus
Pseudascozonus
Ramgea
Thelebolus
Trichobolus

References

Ascomycota orders
Leotiomycetes